Amram Gaon (or Amram bar Sheshna, Hebrew:  עמרם בר רב ששנא, or sometimes: Amram ben Sheshna  or Amram b. Sheshna; died 875) was a gaon, head of the Jewish  Talmud Academy of Sura during the 9th century.

He authored many responsa, but his chief work was liturgical. He was the first to arrange a complete liturgy for the synagogue.  His Prayer Book (Siddur Rav Amram or Seder Rav Amram), which took the form of a long responsum to the Jews of Spain, is still extant and was an important influence on most of the current rites in use among the Jews.

Biography
Amram ben Sheshna was a pupil of Natronai ben Hilai, Gaon of Sura, and was exceptionally honored with the title of Gaon within the lifetime of his teacher. Eventually, he broke away from his teacher and started his own seat of learning.

Upon Natronai's death, about 857, the full title and dignities of the geonate were conferred upon Amram, a title which he held for 18 years, until his death.

Responsa
He is the author of about 120 responsa (most of which were published in Salonica, 1792, in the collection entitled "Sha'arei Tzedek") touching almost every aspect of Jewish jurisprudence. They afford insight into Amram's personality as well as religious practice among Jews of that period. For example, the ruling that interest may not be exacted even from non-Jews, nor even such minor profits as the Talmud designates as "the dust of interest", these being allowed only when customary in non-Jewish business circles. It is characteristic of Amram's method to avoid extreme stringency; thus he decides that a slave who has embraced Judaism, but desires to postpone circumcision until he feels strong enough for it, is not to be hurried. He combats superstition, and places himself almost in opposition to the Talmud, when he protests that there is no sense in fasting on account of bad dreams, since the true nature of dreams is not known. Amram's rules concerning the methodology of the Talmud are of considerable value.

Siddur Rav Amram

The most important work of Amram, marking him as one of the most prominent of the geonim before Saadiah, is his prayer book, the so-called Siddur Rav Amram. Amram was the first to arrange a complete liturgy for use in synagogue and home. His book forms the foundation both of the Spanish-Portuguese and of the German-Polish liturgies, and has exerted great influence upon Jewish religious practice for more than a thousand years, an influence which to some extent is still felt at the present day. For Amram did not content himself with giving the mere text of the prayers, but in a species of running commentary added many Talmudic and gaonic regulations relating to the prayers and their associated ceremonies. His siddur, which was made familiar by the many excerpts quoted from it by the medieval liturgical writers, and which served as the model for Saadia's and Maimonides' own prayer texts, was published complete for the first time i in Warsaw, in the year 1865 under the title Siddur Rav Amram Gaon.

The work as published is composed of two parts. The second part containing the selichot and pizmonim for the month of Elul, for Rosh Hashana and Yom Kippur, is certainly not the work of Amram, but appears to belong to a much later period. Even the first portion, which contains the prayers proper, is full of interpolations, some of which, such as the kedushah for private prayer, are evidently later additions in the manuscripts. But not much weight can be attached even to portions of the book which are specifically given under the name of Amram; many of the explanations are certainly not by him, but by the editors who appended his name to them, speaking of him in the third person. These explanations of the prayers make no reference to any authorities later than the following: Natronai II, Amram's teacher (17 times); Shalom, Natronai's predecessor in the gaonate (7 times); Judah, Paltoi, Zadok, and Moses, geonim before Amram (once each); Cohen Tzedek (twice); Nahshon and Tzemach, contemporaries of Amram (twice each); and Nathan of unknown date. The only authority mentioned of later date than Amram is Saadia. This indicates that the additions to the text of the prayers must have originated in Amram's time. Certainty on this point, however, can only be obtained by a comparison of the printed text with the manuscripts; that of Almanzi, according to the specimens given by Luzzatto, varies considerably from the printed text. Israel ben Todros (1305) mentions some azharot as having been composed by Amram; but no trace of these can now be found.

The text
No early manuscripts of this prayer book survive, and later manuscripts appear to be heavily edited to conform with the rites in use at the time: we therefore cannot be certain of the exact wording preferred by Amram Gaon himself.  Evidence for this is:

The manuscripts differ widely among themselves
The text of the prayers often differs from the surviving responsa of Natronai Gaon and other contemporary authorities, and occasionally even with the halachic commentary of the siddur itself
There are many instances where a later authority, such as Abraham ben Nathan's Sefer ha-Manhig or David Abudirham, argues for text A "as prescribed by Amram Gaon" as against text B "found in popular usage", but the current version of Amram Gaon shows text B.

Relation to current rites
The Siddur Rav Amram was originally sent to the communities of Spain, in response to a request for guidance on the laws of prayer.  However, it never seems to have been adopted by them as a package deal, though they respected the individual halachic rulings contained in it.  On the contrary, they appear to have edited it to suit their own requirements, so that the wording of the manuscripts and the printed version often contains variants likely to be derived from early versions of the Spanish rite.  None of these early versions survives, but secondary evidence such as the Sefer ha-Manhig and the Siddur Rav Amram itself indicates that in certain respects these were different from the Sephardic rite in use today and nearer to other old European rites such as the Provençal, Italian and Old French rites, which reflect varying degrees of Palestinian influence.  The later Sephardic rite has been revised to bring it into closer conformity with the rulings of the halachic codes, which themselves often reflect the opinions of the Geonim, and is therefore of a more purely Babylonian character: thus, paradoxically, it has moved away from the current wording of the Siddur Rav Amram and towards what was presumably its original wording.

Conversely, the Siddur Rav Amram was a major source used in the standardization of the nusach Ashkenaz, which was already akin to the old European family. For this reason, to a modern reader the wording of the Siddur Rav Amram appears far closer to an Ashkenazi than a Sephardi text, a fact which misled Moses Gaster into believing that the Ashkenazi rite was based on the Babylonian while the Sephardic rite was essentially Palestinian.

Published texts of the Siddur
Seder Rab Amram, ed. Coronel: Warsaw 1865
Seder Rav Amram Gaon, ed. Hedegard: Lund 1951
Seder Rav Amram Gaon, ed. Goldschmidt: Jerusalem 1971
Seder Rav Amram Gaon, ed. Kronholm: Lund 1974
Seder Rav Amram Gaon, ed. Harfenes: Bene Berak 1994

External links
Seder Rav Amram (Jerusalem 1912 edition): Volume 1; Volume 2
Seder Rav Amram (Warsaw 1865 edition, scanned text, Hebrew only)

Further reading
Elbogen, Ismar, Jewish Liturgy: A Comprehensive History: Jewish Publication Society 1993
Louis Ginzberg, Geonica: New York 1909
Goldschmidt, Meִhkare Tefillah u-Fiyyut (On Jewish Liturgy): Jerusalem 1978
Reif, Stefan, Judaism and Hebrew Prayer: Cambridge 1993. Hardback , ; Paperback , 
Wieder, Naphtali, The Formation of Jewish Liturgy: In the East and the West
Zimmels, Ashkenazim and Sephardim: their Relations, Differences, and Problems As Reflected in the Rabbinical Responsa : London 1958 (since reprinted).

References

Geonim
875 deaths
9th-century rabbis
Rabbis of Academy of Sura
Year of birth unknown